The Inland Steel Company was an American steel company active in 1893–1998. Its history as an independent firm thus spanned much of the 20th century.  It was headquartered in Chicago at the landmark Inland Steel Building.

Inland Steel was an integrated steel company that reduced iron ore to steel. Its sole steel mill was located in East Chicago, Indiana, on the Indiana Harbor and Ship Canal and a large landfill protruding out into Lake Michigan. The steel mill's shoreline location enabled it to take in steelmaking commodities, such as iron ore, coal, and limestone, by lake freighter. Throughout much of its life, Inland Steel operated its own fleet of bulk carrier vessels.

Inland Steel was founded by Jewish owners because of anti-Semitism in the steel industry, and thereby provided employment to other Jewish workers.

Firm history

Inland Steel was founded in 1893 through the purchase, by financier Philip Block, of a small failed Chicago Heights, Illinois steel mill, Chicago Steel Works.  The Block family led Inland Steel's recovery and, in 1901, Inland Steel pledged to raise more than $1 million to build an open-hearth mill in East Chicago.  This expansion caused the firm to grow more than tenfold in size, from 250 workers in 1897 to 2,600 in 1910.

Inland Steel continued to face heavy competition from U.S. Steel, the Pittsburgh-based giant that at that time possessed a dominant share of the U.S. steel market.  World wars increased steel demand and pushed Inland Steel forward.  In 1917 (World War I), Inland Steel's production broke the 1.0-million ton (0.9m tonne) mark for the first time; and in 1930 the firm completed a new office headquarters in East Chicago, which survives.  By World War II the Chicago-area steelmaker had 14,000 employees and was producing 3.4 million tons (3.0m tonnes) per year.

Starting in the 1950s, Inland Steel specialized in cold-rolled sheet and strip steel for motor vehicles.  In 1956–1957, the successful firm constructed a new corporate headquarters, the Inland Steel Building, in downtown Chicago.  Employment at the Indiana Harbor mill rose toward its peak of 25,000 in 1969.

The decline in the U.S. steel industry, starting in 1970, affected Inland Steel.  Foreign steel companies were increasing their presence in the world steel market.  During the late 1970s Inland Steel formed several joint ventures with Nippon Steel to create I/N Tek and I/N Kote, but profitability continued to be difficult to attain.  After a series of internal reforms, Inland rapidly became so profitable in 1997 that, uniquely amongst U.S. integrated steel mills, they became desirable for acquisition.  Ispat International acquired Inland Steel in 1998 eventually becoming ArcelorMittal. As of 2020, the assets of Inland Steel are now part of Cleveland-Cliffs.

Further reading
 Moise Dreyfus Obituary – http://archives.chicagotribune.com/1937/05/13/page/18/article/moise-dreyfus-estate-valued-at-11-3-millions
 Book, 50 Years of Inland Steel, 1943
 Booklet, “The Story of Inland Steel”, 1964
 Booklets, “Inland Steel at 100: Beginning a Second Century of Progress”, 1993.
 Perry, W.A., Booklet, “History of Inland Steel Co. to 1971", b
 Perry, W. A., Booklet, “A History of Inland Steel Company and the Indiana Harbor Works” (ca. 1980)
 Perry, W.A (1979) A History of Inland Steel Company And The Indiana Harbor Works (booklet)
 Perry, William A. & Saran, Sam H. Booklet, A History of Inland Steel Company and the Indiana Harbor Works (1992).
 Perry, William A. & Saran, Sam H. Booklet, A History of Inland Steel Company and the Indiana Harbor Works(1993).
 Wilder, John Watson	Book, Inland Steel, 1893–1943.

References

External links

Artist's Rendering, Inland Steel Company, Chicago Heights, Illinois plant, 1894 The Digital Collections of IUPIU University Library.
The Michael Tenenbaum papers at Hagley Museum and Library  consist of a series of his writings and speeches and a small number of Inland Steel Company publications.
 Arcelor Mittal page on Indiana Harbor – former Inland Steel plant

Steel companies of the United States
Ironworks and steel mills in the United States
Manufacturing companies based in Chicago
East Chicago, Indiana
American companies established in 1893
Manufacturing companies established in 1893
Manufacturing companies disestablished in 1998
ArcelorMittal
American companies disestablished in 1998
1893 establishments in Illinois
1998 disestablishments in Illinois
Defunct manufacturing companies based in Illinois